Lycée franco-finladais d'Helsinki ( HRSK) is a Franco-Finnish school in Helsinki, Finland founded by French Catherine Servé in 1947.
It is run by the Finnish state since 1977 with a Finnish school system, the Republic of France paying wages of 7-10 teachers. Students graduating there receive the Finnish matriculation examination and French government give to students the diplomas of equal value of French baccalauréat.

The school's architecture was worked on by Finnish architect Aino Kallio-Ericsson in 1956.

References

External links 

  Helsingin ranskalais-suomalainen koulu (Home page) 

Schools in Helsinki
French international schools in Europe
International schools in Finland